The 3rd Edda Awards were held on 11 November 2001 at Broadway Night Club in Reykjavik. The awards were hosted by actress Edda Heiðrún Backman and singer Valgeir Guðjónsson. The show was broadcast live on RÚV.

Short films were also included for the first time in the Best television program (staged).  As in the previous awards the public was given the right to vote online in all categories. The academy had 70% say in the results and the public 30%. Except for the Best Television Personality which the public had 100% say in the results.

The film Mávahlátur received most nominations, ten in all, and won six awards.

New Categories 
 Edda Award for Best Screenplay
 Edda Award for Best News Anchor

Results 
The nominees and winners were: (Winners highlighted in bold)

Best Film:
 Íkingút
 Mávahlátur
 Villiljós
Best Director:
 Ágúst Guðmundsson, for Mávahlátur
 Gísli Snær Erlingsson, for Íkingút
 Ragnar Bragason, for Fóstbræður
Best Actor:
 Hjalti Rúnar Jónsson, for Íkingút
Jón Gnarr, for Fóstbræður
 Pálmi Gestsson, for Íkingút
Best Actress:
 Halldóra Geirharðsdóttir, for Þá yrði líklega farin af mér feimni
 Margrét Vilhjálmsdóttir, forMávahlátur
 Ugla Egilsdóttir, for Mávahlátur
Best Supporting Actor:
 Björn J. Friðbjörnsson, for Villiljós
 Eyvindur Erlendsson, for Mávahlátur
Hilmir Snær Guðnason, for Mávahlátur
Best Supporting Actress:
 Halldóra Geirharðsdóttir, for Mávahlátur
 Kristbjörg Kjeld, for Mávahlátur
 Sigurveig Jónsdóttir, for Mávahlátur
Best Screenplay:
 Ágúst Guðmundsson, for Mávahlátur
 Huldar Breiðfjörð, for Villiljós
 Jón Steinar Ragnarsson, for Íkingút
Best Documentary:
 Braggabúar
 Fiðlan
 Lalli Johns
Best Television Program (staged)/ Shortfilm:
 Fóstbræður
 Krossgötur
 Þá yrði líklega farin af mér feimni
Best Television Program:
 Mósaík
 Ok
 Tantra – Listin að elska meðvitað
Best News Anchor:
 Árni Snævarr, for Stöð 2 News
 Eva Bergþóra Guðbergsdóttir, for Stöð 2 News
 Ómar Ragnarsson, for RÚV News
Best Television Personality:
 Logi Bergmann Eiðsson
ÍKSA Professional Awards:
 Hrönn Kristinsdóttir, for producing Ikingut
 Þorfinnur Guðnason, for editing  Lalli Johns
 Páll Baldvin Baldvinsson, for producing Tuttugasta öldin
Honorary Award:
 Gunnar Eyjólfsson and Kristbjörg Kjeld, actors, for their contribution to Icelandic television and cinema.

External links 
 Edda Awards official website
 Edda Awards 2001 Picture Gallery at mbl.is

References 

Edda Awards
2001 film awards